Last Night When We Were Young is a studio album by trumpeter Art Farmer - with an orchestra of strings arranged and conducted by Quincy Jones. It was recorded in three sessions in 1957 and released the following year on ABC-Paramount.

Track listing 
 "Two Sleepy People" (Hoagy Carmichael, Frank Loesser) – 3:14
 "Someone to Watch Over Me" (George Gershwin, Ira Gershwin) – 3:35
 "I Concentrate on You" (Cole Porter) – 2:54
 "Ill Wind" (Harold Arlen, Ted Koehler) – 3:43
 "Last Night When We Were Young" (Arlen, Yip Harburg) – 3:00
 "Out of This World" (Arlen, Johnny Mercer) – 4:07
 "When I Fall in Love" (Victor Young, Edward Heyman) – 3:34
 "Tangorine" (Dizzy Gillespie) – 2:45
 "What's Good About Goodbye?" (Arlen, Leo Robin) – 3:41

Personnel 
Art Farmer – trumpet
Hank Jones – piano
Tommy Kay - guitar (on March 28, tracks 2, 4, 8)
Barry Galbraith – guitar (on April 24 & 29)
Addison Farmer – bass
Osie Johnson – drums (on March 28, tracks 2, 4, 8)
Sol Gubin – drums (on April 24 & 29)
Quincy Jones – arranger, conductor
Orchestra on March 28
Jim Buffington - French horn
Romeo Penque - flute
Harry Lookofsky, Gene Orloff, Leonard Posner, Arnold Eidus, Julius Held - violin
David Mankovitz, Walter Trampler - viola
George Ricci - cello
Orchestra on April 24
Don Corrado - French horn
Sal Amato - flute
Harry Lookofsky, Gene Orloff, Leonard Posner, Arnold Eidus, Harry Urbout - violin
David Mankovitz, Howard Kay - viola
George Ricci - cello
Orchestra on April 29
Sal Amato, Jerry Sanfino, Stan Webb, flute
Harry Lookofsky, Gene Orloff, Leonard Posner, Alvin Rudnitsky, Sol Shapiro - violin
Howard Kay, Burt Fisch - viola
Maurice Brown - cello
Betty Glamann - harp

References 

1958 albums
Art Farmer albums
Albums arranged by Quincy Jones
ABC Records albums